Perthshire is a historic county and registration county in central Scotland.

Perthshire may also refer to:

Scotland 
 Perth and Kinross, a council area of Scotland, originating in 1929 as a merger of the administrative counties of Perthshire and Kinross-shire
 Perthshire (UK Parliament constituency), a constituency from 1708 to 1885
 Perthshire (Parliament of Scotland constituency), a constituency before 1708

Elsewhere 
 Perthshire, Mississippi, an unincorporated community in Bolivar County
 City of Stirling, Western Australia, formerly the Shire of Perth